Saith Sakala (born 17 July 1996 in Lusaka, Zambia) is a Zambian professional footballer who plays for Al-Lewaa as a winger.

Club career

Zambia
Sakala was born in Lusaka and joined Happy Hearts Academy in Zambia in 2010. He signed his first professional contract with Zambian Premier league club NAPSA Stars F.C. in 2014.

References

External links
 

Living people
1996 births
Zambian footballers
Zambia international footballers
Association football wingers
NAPSA Stars F.C. players
Zanaco F.C. players
Al-Fateh SC players
Al-Nojoom FC players
Al-Tai FC players
Al-Ansar FC (Medina) players
Jeddah Club players
Bisha FC players
Al-Lewaa Club players
Saudi Professional League players
Saudi First Division League players
Saudi Second Division players
Zambian expatriate footballers
Zambian expatriate sportspeople in Saudi Arabia
Expatriate footballers in Saudi Arabia
Sportspeople from Lusaka